Ari Nyman (born 7 February 1984) is a retired Finnish footballer. He played both as a defensive midfielder or centre-back. Nyman has also played at right-back for Finland.

Career

FC Inter Turku
Nyman played his first match in 2000 when he was only 16 years old. In 2002, he was named for the best under-21 player in Finland.
He served as a loyal member of Inter for six seasons, before leaving abroad. He visited Vålerenga, before joining FC Thun in Axpo Super League.

FC Thun
Nyman was signed by FC Thun for almost one million euros in 2007. He immediately broke into the Thun side and played regularly in the first team.

Thun was relegated after scandalous season 2007–2008 and Nyman stated that he wants to leave. He was on trial with VfB Stuttgart, but didn't get an offer.

Back to Turku
It was rumoured for a long time, that unhappy Nyman was moving back to Inter Turku because of Thun's financial problems. Finally in April 2009, Inter announced that Nyman had signed for three years. He was labeled the successor to Dominic Chatto as a controlling midfielder.

Nyman decided to retire, after the 2018 season.

International
Nyman made his debut for the Finnish national football team against Bahrain on 1 December 2004. He is a back-up of Finland's defence, usually playing at right-back for Finland as a substitute for Petri Pasanen. He played for Finland on youth levels and in 2002 was voted for the under-21 footballer of the year.

References

Guardian Football

External links
 

1984 births
Living people
Finnish footballers
Finland international footballers
FC Thun players
FC Inter Turku players
Association football defenders
Footballers from Turku